Syncerus acoelotus is an extinct species of bovid closely related to the Cape buffalo. It lived during the Late Pliocene and Early Pleistocene.

Fossils of this species were first found in the Olduvai gorge back in 1978, and it was described several years later. S. acoelotus was larger, and probably ancestral to, its living relative.

References

Prehistoric bovids
Pliocene even-toed ungulates
Pleistocene even-toed ungulates
Pliocene mammals of Africa
Pleistocene mammals of Africa
Prehistoric mammals of Africa

Fossil taxa described in 1985